Montague Joseph Feilden (8 May 1816 – 17 October 1898) was a British Liberal and Whig politician.

Born in Feniscowles, Lancashire, Feilden was the son of William and Mary Haughton (née Jackson) Feilden. He married firstly to Mary Anne Valentine, daughter of William Valentine, in 1846. After her death in 1859, he remarried to Alice Thoume, daughter of James Thoume, in 1865 and they had at least one child, Montague Leyland Feilden (1867–1900).

Feilden was elected Whig MP for Blackburn at a by-election in 1853—caused by the election of William Eccles being declared void on petition, due to bribery—and held the seat until 1857 when he did not seek re-election. He later attempted to regain the seat as a Liberal in 1868, but was unsuccessful.

Feilden was also a Lieutenant-Colonel in the 3rd Battalion, Loyal North Lancashire Regiment, a Deputy Lieutenant of Lancashire, and a Justice of the Peace for Lancashire.

References

External links
 

UK MPs 1852–1857
1816 births
1898 deaths
Deputy Lieutenants of Lancashire
Whig (British political party) MPs for English constituencies